Science was a community in LaSalle County, Illinois, United States, located along the Illinois River just south of modern-day Utica.

References

External links

Former populated places in Illinois
Populated places in LaSalle County, Illinois